Symmetrischema altisona is a moth in the family Gelechiidae. It was described by Edward Meyrick in 1917. It is found in Peru.

The wingspan is 11–12 mm. The forewings are dark fuscous, slightly whitish sprinkled, and with the dorsal area tinged with ochreous brown. The stigmata are cloudy and black, with the plical obliquely before the first discal. The hindwings are bluish grey.

References

Symmetrischema
Moths described in 1917